Events from the year 1864 in Scotland.

Incumbents

Law officers 
 Lord Advocate – James Moncreiff
 Solicitor General for Scotland – George Young

Judiciary 
 Lord President of the Court of Session and Lord Justice General – Lord Colonsay
 Lord Justice Clerk – Lord Glenalmond

Events 
 21 June – last public execution in Edinburgh – George Bryce, the Ratho murderer.
 19 July – Chalmers Hospital opened in Banff, Aberdeenshire.
 2 September – the first Ottoman ironclad Osmaniye is launched by Robert Napier and Sons on the River Clyde.
 8 December – James Clerk Maxwell presents his paper A Dynamical Theory of the Electromagnetic Field to the Royal Society, treating light as an electromagnetic wave.
 Hall, Russell & Company established as marine engineers in Aberdeen.
 The National Bank of Scotland becomes the first Scottish bank to open an office in London.
 Historian John Hill Burton publishes The Scot Abroad.

Births 
 2 January – James Caird, shipowner (died 1954 in England)
 17 January – David Torrence, film actor (died 1951)
 5 February – Marion Gilchrist, medical doctor (died 1952)
 6 February – John Henry Mackay, anarchist writer (died 1933 in Germany)
 14 February – James Burns, shipowner (died 1919)
 8 March – James Craig Annan, photographer (died 1946)
 28 May – Jessie Newbery, née Rowat, embroiderer (died 1948 in England)
 10 June – Ninian Comper, Gothic Revival architect (died 1960 in England)
 1 October – Alexander Grant, biscuit manufacturer (died 1937)
 7 October – Harrington Mann, painter (died 1937 in the United States)
 31 October – Cosmo Gordon Lang, Archbishop of Canterbury (died 1945 in England)
 4 November – Robert Lorimer, architect (died 1929)
 13 December – John Quinton Pringle, painter (died 1925)

Deaths 
 6 January – John Clements Wickham, explorer, naval officer, magistrate and administrator (born 1798)
 1 June – Sir John Watson Gordon, portrait painter (born 1788)
 6 August – Catherine Sinclair, novelist and children's writer (born 1800)
 1 October – Ignatius Spencer, English priest (born 1799)

See also 
 Timeline of Scottish history
 1864 in the United Kingdom

References 

 
Years of the 19th century in Scotland
Scotland
1860s in Scotland